The Burlington Royals were a minor league baseball team in Burlington, North Carolina, United States. They were a Rookie-level team in the Appalachian League. The team was affiliated with the Cleveland Indians from 1986 to 2006 as the Burlington Indians. They were known as the Royals during an affiliation with the Kansas City Royals from 2007 to 2020. The Royals played their home games at Burlington Athletic Stadium. Opened in 1960, Burlington Athletic Stadium held 3,500 fans.

Major League Baseball alumni of note are featured on the wall inside the men's restroom at the Burlington Athletic Stadium in the form of painted jerseys: Manny Ramirez (#22), Jim Thome (#25), Bartolo Colón (#40) and CC Sabathia (#52).

The start of the 2020 season was postponed due to the COVID-19 pandemic before ultimately being cancelled on June 30. In conjunction with a contraction of Minor League Baseball beginning with the 2021 season, the Appalachian League was reorganized as a collegiate summer baseball league, and the Royals were replaced by a new franchise in the revamped league designed for rising college freshmen and sophomores.

Playoffs
2019: Defeated Pulaski 2–1 in semifinals; lost to Johnson City 2–1 in finals.
2016: Defeated Princeton 2–1 in semifinals; lost to Johnson City 2–0 in finals.
2012: Defeated Johnson City 2–1 in semifinals; lost to Elizabethton 2–1 in finals.
2010: Lost to Johnson City 2–0 in semifinals.
1993: Defeated Elizabethton 2–0 to win championship.
1991: Lost to Pulaski 2–0 in finals.
1988: Lost to Kingsport 2–0 in finals.
1987: Defeated Johnson City 2–0 to win championship.

Burlington Indians (Carolina League)
In addition to the Appalachian League version of the Burlington Indians, from 1958 to 1964 a team representing Burlington, N.C., of the same name competed in the Carolina League (Class B through 1962; thereafter Class A) as a Cleveland farm club. During its seven years of existence, the Carolina League Burlington Indians won one league championship. Its players included future major leaguers Luis Tiant and Duke Sims.

Prior to opening their Burlington ballpark in 1960, the club was known as Alamance, and played their home games at Graham Athletic Park a.k.a. Graham Park. That park still exists, as the ballfield for Graham Middle School on East Pine Street in Graham, North Carolina.

Burlington Indians (Central Association)
A third team called the Burlington Indians was based in Burlington, Iowa, and played in the Class C Central Association in the late 1940s.

References

External links
 Burlington Royals Official Site

Baseball teams established in 1986
Baseball teams disestablished in 2020
Defunct Appalachian League teams
Kansas City Royals minor league affiliates
Cleveland Guardians minor league affiliates
Professional baseball teams in North Carolina
1986 establishments in North Carolina
2020 disestablishments in North Carolina
Burlington, North Carolina